Va (Tamil numeral for 1/4; working title: Va Quarter Cutting) is a 2010 Indian Tamil-language black comedy film written and directed by Pushkar-Gayathri. It stars Shiva, SPB Charan and Lekha Washington , with Kalyan, John Vijay and Abhinayashree playing supporting roles. The film's story takes place in one night, in which a man, with the help of his would-be brother-in-law, hunts for a last liquor before leaving to Saudi Arabia.

The movie was a box office Sleeper hit made within a shoestring budget of 2 crore. The film, produced by Sashikanth Sivaji's YNOT Studios and distributed by Dhayanidhi Alagiri's Cloud Nine Movies, features film score composed by G. V. Prakash Kumar and cinematography by Nirav Shah. The shooting of the film commenced in early 2010 and was held at various locations in Chennai.

Plot 
Sunderrajan aka Sura (Shiva) comes to Chennai from Coimbatore on his way to Saudi Arabia. He is received by Marthandam (S. P. B. Charan), a veterinary doctor who is going to marry his sister soon. After the travel agent informs Sura that he cannot taste liquor or women in Saudi, he and Marthandam go to a wine shop to have the last gulp. It is a dry day thanks to elections. Sura is determined to taste the 'quarter' and starts his journey to various places in Chennai where he is told that liquor would be available. He goes to a politico who supplies wine for votes, a star hotel, an Anglo-Indian group of youngsters, a fish market, a gambling den, a kulfi shop, and a brothel house, among other places, all in search of 'quarter'. During his trip, he meets Saraswathi aka Saro (Lekha Washington), who attempts suicide after her parents scold her, and King-Prince, a father-son duo (both roles played by John Vijay) who runs a gambling center. How Sura, in the company of Marthandam and Saro, succeeds in his mission and leaves for Saudi forms the remaining story.

Cast

Production

Development 

Sashikanth Sivaji of YNOT Studios, began discussions for his next production in late 2009, when filming his 2010 blockbuster Thamizh Padam. He decided to work with director-duo Pushkar-Gayathri who he thought had a fresh and different script. Fresh out of the success of their debut venture Oram Po, the husband-wife duo had worked on a script that revolved around the local flavors of Chennai. They wanted their next film to be a contrast to Oram Po, which too was based on Chennai and hence worked on a comedy script for their second movie.

The film was publicized under the title Va: Quarter Cutting, but due to the use of English words, it did not meet the requirements for the then Government of Tamil Nadu's Entertainment Tax Exemption Act, which demands titles of creative works to be in Tamil only. Thus, the film's title was changed to Va, meaning one-fourths.

Filming 
Filming began in early 2010. Shooting was carried out in and around Chennai in the following weeks. The film's main portions were extensively shot across places in the old city and Marina beach.

Release
The satellite rights of the film were sold to Kalaignar. The film was given a "A" certificate by the Indian Censor Board.

Soundtrack 

Soundtrack scored by G. V. Prakash Kumar. The track Unnai Kan Thedudhe is heavily inspired by his own Un Mela Aasadhan from Aayirathil Oruvan. Several parts of the score are adapted from soundtracks of the films Kill Bill, Amelie, Lock, Stock and Two Smoking Barrels, Sherlock Holmes and Snatch.

 Tracklist

References

External links
 

2010 comedy films
2010 films
2010s comedy road movies
2010s Tamil-language films
Films about alcoholism
Films scored by G. V. Prakash Kumar
Films set in Chennai
Films shot in Chennai
Indian black comedy films
Indian comedy road movies
Films directed by Pushkar–Gayathri